Transcription initiation factor TFIID subunit 12 is a protein that in humans is encoded by the TAF12 gene.

Function 

Control of transcription by RNA polymerase II involves the basal transcription machinery, which is a collection of proteins. These proteins with RNA polymerase II, assemble into complexes that are modulated by transactivator proteins that bind to cis-regulatory elements located adjacent to the transcription start site. Some modulators interact directly with the basal complex, whereas others may act as bridging proteins linking transactivators to the basal transcription factors. Some of these associated factors are weakly attached, whereas others are tightly associated with TBP in the TFIID complex. Among the latter are the TAF proteins. Different TAFs are predicted to mediate the function of distinct transcriptional activators for a variety of gene promoters and RNA polymerases. TAF12 interacts directly with TBP as well as with TAF2I.

Interactions 

TAF12 has been shown to interact with TAF9 and Transcription initiation protein SPT3 homolog.

References

Further reading

External links